Tunisia have participated in the African Cup of Nations 20 times and hold the record for the number of consecutive participations with 15 between 1994 and 2021. First participation in 1962, it took third place by defeating Uganda with a score of 3–0, only 4 countries participated in this edition. In 1965 edition, Tunisia were allowed to stage the compitition and reached the final and lost the title to Ghana 2–3 after extra time.

In the 1996 edition, the team reached the final for the second time, but was again defeated by hosts South Africa 0–2. The best participation in this tournament came after 8 years when Tunisia in her country reached the final for the third time and won this time after defeating Morocco in the final 2–1, Francileudo Santos and Ziad Jaziri scored the goals. The last participation was in the 2021 edition in Cameroon, and the team was eliminated in the quarter-finals.

In total, Tunisia participated in the African Cup of Nations 20 times, played 80 matches, won in 25 matches, tied 29 matches and lost 26 of them, scored 99 goals and accepted 94 goals. The biggest defeat was 4–0 against Ethiopia on 12 November 1965 and Mauritania on 16 January 2022. The biggest defeat was 3–0 against Cameroon on 10 February 2000, Guinea on 30 January 2006 and Ivory Coast on 26 January 2013. Francileudo Santos is the most Tunisian player to score in the tournament with 10 goals. Youssef Msakni is the most participating Tunisian in the tournament, he played 25 matches in 7 participations between 2010 and 2021. Tunisia hosted the compitition on three occasions in 1965, 1994 and 2004.

Records

Matches 

 

1 The match was abandoned after Tunisia walked off in the 42nd minute with the score tied at 1–1 to protest the officiating. Nigeria were awarded a 2–0 win, and Tunisia were banned from the next tournament.

Statistics

Head to head 

 1 Includes games against

Goalscorers

Hat-tricks

Awards

AFCON Top Scorer 

 2004: Francileudo Santos 
 2015: Ahmed Akaïchi

Goal of the tournament 

 2013: Youssef Msakni

Squads

References

External links 
 Africa Cup of Nations – Archives competitions – cafonline.com

 
Tunisia national football team
Countries at the Africa Cup of Nations